Ishtar Airlines was an airline based in Dubai, United Arab Emirates, although it was a private Iraqi airline operating scheduled passenger services, its main bases were its only destinations, Baghdad International Airport and Dubai International Airport.

Ishtar Airlines headquarters was in Deira, Dubai, United Arab Emirates.

History
The airline was established in March 2005 by a group of former Iraqi Airways pilots.

Ishtar Airlines operations went quiet in October 2009 and seems to have now ceased operations altogether.

Destinations
Ishtar Airlines operated scheduled passenger services to the following destinations in July 2007:

Baghdad - Baghdad International Airport Base

Dubai - Dubai International Airport Base

It had planned to expand its operations to other destinations in Europe and the Middle East.

Fleet

The Ishtar Airlines fleet included the following aircraft in October 2009:

Former

Prior to ceasing operations, Ishtar Airlines previously operated the following aircraft:

References

Defunct airlines of Iraq
Airlines established in 2005
Airlines disestablished in 2009
Iraqi companies established in 2005
2009 disestablishments in Iraq